The following is a list of notable events and releases that have happened, or are expected to happen in 2023 in music in South Korea.

Award shows and festivals

Award ceremonies

Debuting and disbanding in 2023

Debuting groups

 8Turn
 Limelight
Mave:
 TripleS

Solo debuts
 Jinyoung
Hwang Min-hyun
Jimin
Jisoo

Disbandments
Astro – Jinjin & Rocky
Brave Girls
D1ce
Momoland

Releases in 2023

First quarter

January

February

March

Second quarter

April

May

Top songs on record

Circle Digital Chart No. 1 Songs
"Ay-Yo" – NCT 127 
"Ditto" – NewJeans

References

2023 in South Korean music
South Korean music
K-pop